In organic chemistry, the Baker–Nathan effect is observed with reaction rates for certain chemical reactions with certain substrates where the order in reactivity cannot be explained solely by an inductive effect of substituents.

This effect was described in 1935 by John W. Baker and W. S. Nathan. They examined the chemical kinetics for the reaction of pyridine with benzyl bromide and with a range of benzyl bromides with different para alkyl substituents (reaction product a pyridinium salt).

The reaction is facilitated by electron-releasing substituents (the inductive effect) and in general the observed order (with decreasing reactivity) is tert-butyl > isopropyl > ethyl > methyl. The observed order in this particular reaction however was methyl > ethyl> isopropyl > tert-butyl. In 1935 Baker and Nathan explained the observed difference in terms of a conjugation effect and in later years after the advent of hyperconjugation (1939) as its predecessor.

A fundamental problem with the effect is that differences in the observed order are relatively small and therefore difficult to measure accurately. Other researchers have found similar results or very different results. An alternative explanation for the effect is differential solvation as orders invert on going from the solution phase to the gas phase.

References

Physical organic chemistry